Furong (unless otherwise noted) may refer to:

Locations 
Districts
 Furong District, Changsha, Hunan

Towns
 Furong, Yongshun County, Hunan, renamed following the film Hibiscus Town
 , subdivision of Wan'an County, Jiangxi
 , subdivision of Fuxin Mongol Autonomous County, Liaoning
 , subdivision of Pingshan County, Sichuan
 , subdivision of Yueqing, Zhejiang

Other places
 Furong Mountain, a mountain in Ningxiang, Hunan, China
 Furong River, a tributary of the Wu River in Southwest China
 Furong Cave, in Wulong District, Chongqing
 Furong, the Chinese name of Seremban, Malaysia

Other uses
Furong dan, or Egg foo young, an omelette dish found in UK and American Chinese cuisine
Sister Furong (born 1977), nickname of Shi Hengxia, a woman who received worldwide notoriety in 2005 for her postings on the Internet
Furong Daokai (1043–1118), Chinese Zen Buddhist monk
Hibiscus Town, 1986 Chinese film directed by Xie Jin